The Communion of Western Orthodox Churches (CWOC; , CEOO) is a communion of Christian churches.

Overview 
The communion currently comprises three member churches:
 The Celtic Orthodox Church
 The French Orthodox Church
 The Orthodox Church of the Gauls

The CWOC was established on 25 December 2007 with the signing of its charter and the concelebration of a mass for the Nativity of the Lord by Bishop Maël de Brescia and Bishop Mark of the Celtic Orthodox Church, Bishop Vigile and Bishop Martin Laplaud of the French Orthodox Church, and Bishop Gregory Mendez of the Orthodox Church of the Gauls.

Relations with other churches 

Written into the directives of the CWOC are provisions for accepting other Orthodox churches which also subscribe to its charter and principles:

References

External links 
  
 Photo gallery

Western Rite Orthodoxy
Eastern Orthodoxy in France
Oriental Orthodoxy in France
Christianity in Europe
Christian organizations established in 2007